James Charles "Hamish" Stothard (6 May 1913 – 26 February 1997) was a Scottish athlete who competed in the 1934 British Empire Games.

At the 1934 Empire Games he won the bronze medal in the 880 yards event. He was also a member of the Scottish relay team which won the bronze medal in the 4×440 yards competition.

External links
Profile at TOPS in athletics

1913 births
1997 deaths
Scottish male middle-distance runners
Athletes (track and field) at the 1934 British Empire Games
Commonwealth Games bronze medallists for Scotland
Commonwealth Games medallists in athletics
Medallists at the 1934 British Empire Games